Pilar Rahola i Martínez (Barcelona, 21 October 1958) is a Spanish journalist, writer, and former politician and MP.

Career 

Rahola studied Spanish and Catalan Philology at the Universitat de Barcelona. She has published several books in Spanish and Catalan, and she is a columnist at La Vanguardia in Spain, and collaborated with conservative newspapers like La Nación in Argentina, and Diario de América in the United States. She appears frequently on television and has taken part in several university lectures.

She comes from a republican and anti-fascist family, and several of her relatives have been politicians or writers: Pere Rahola, a conservative minister of the navy of the republic (belonging to the 'Lliga Catalanista' nationalist party); Frederic Rahola, first Síndic de Greuges (public defender) in the Generalitat de Catalunya; and Carles Rahola, a writer executed by Francoists. Rahola is married and has three children, two of them adopted: one from Barcelona, the others from Siberia.

From 1987 to 1990, Rahola was director of the Catalan publishing house Pòrtic, and as a journalist, she was involved in covering the Eritrean-Ethiopian War, the Balkan Wars, the Gulf War, and the fall of the Berlin Wall.

As a politician, she was the only member of Esquerra Republicana de Catalunya in Spanish Congress of Deputies representing Barcelona Province in the 5th and 6th Spanish legislatures from 1993 to 2000, as well as serving as vice-mayor of Barcelona city.  She also participated in several committees of investigation, especially those related to political corruption such as the comisión Roldán.

In 1996, Rahola left Esquerra Republicana de Catalunya to join Àngel Colom and Joan Laporta in a new political group, the "Partit per la Independència," but after this failed she decided to concentrate on journalism and writing. Her areas of interest include women's rights, international human rights, and animal rights. In recent years she has spoken of what she considers to be the hypocrisy of left wing politicians who do not share her views with regard to Israel and Zionism.

In 2013 the Jewish National Fund planted a forest with 2,500 trees in her honor in Yatir, in the Negev.

Since 2013 she is a member of the Catalonia's National Transition, official Committee of the Catalan government who works for a referendum on self-determination of Catalonia. She is a strong supporter for Catalan's right of self-determination and independence.

Prizes
Doctor honoris causa in Universidad de Artes y Ciencias de la Comunicación de Santiago de Chile, 2004, for her fight in favour of human rights
Premio Javer Olam (2004), given by Jewish Chilean Community for her fight against antisemitism
Cicla Price (2005), given for her fight against antisemitism
Honour Member of University of Tel Aviv, 2006
Golden Menora Price 2006, with Simone Weil, given by French B'nai B'rith
Scopus Award laureate 2007, given by the Hebrew University of Jerusalem
APEI Prize for her articles, given by "Asociación Profesional Española de Informadores de Prensa, Radio y Televisión"
Honoured guest at the AIPAC's Policy Conference, 2008
Senador Angel Pulido, 2009, given by "Federación de Comunidades Judías de España"
Mass Media Award, 2009, given by American Jewish Committee, for her fight bias to Human Rights
Daniel Pearl Award, 2010, given by Anti-Defamation League, "for her dedicated commitment to an honest and accountable journalistic code of ethics and for speaking honestly to the public"
Morris Abram Human Rights Award, given by UN Watch for her defense of Human Rights . Geneva, 2011.
Samuel Hadas Award 2012, gained with Felipe Gonzalez, José Maria Aznar and Jordi Pujol, and awarded by The Israeli Embassy for the struggle towards good relationships between Jewish people and Spanish people.
 In 2013 the Jewish National Fund planted a forest with 2,500 trees in her honor in Yatir, in the Negev
.-In 2014, the Catalan Police Corps, the Mossos d'Esquadra, awarded it with the distinctive "Mossa d'Honor" .21 It is also distinguished by the distinction of the Forum Carlemany, a grouping of Catalan businessmen.

.- In 2017 She won the Ramon Llull de les Lletres Catalanes prize, awarded by Planeta, the most important prize in Catalan literature, for her novel Rosa de Cendra

Fake PhD Scandal 
Until the summer of 2013, the English and Spanish version of Pilar Rahola's CV on her website claimed that she had received a PhD in Spanish and Catalan Philology from the University of Barcelona. This title was used when introducing her in countless prizes, television interviews and books. During 10 years she never corrected this information even though she had only received a bachelor's degree. When this misinformation was brought to her attention she claimed it was due an error when translating her original Catalan CV.

References
 http://www.international-view.cat/catalonia-s-national-transition
 http://www.kkl.org.il/eng/about-kkl-jnf/green-israel-news/march-2013/pilar-rahola-visit-negev/

Bibliography 
Aquell estiu color de vent – Editorial Pòrtic 1983. 
Color de verano – Editorial Pòrtic 1983. 
Aperitiu nocturn – Editorial Pòrtic 1985. 
La qüestió catalana – Editorial Columna 1993. 
Mujer liberada, hombre cabreado – Editorial Planeta 2000 
Dona alliberada, home emprenyat – Editorial Planeta 2000 
Carta a mi hijo adoptado – Editorial Planeta 2001 
L'adopció un acte d'amor – Editorial Columna 2001 
Carta ao meu filho adoptado – Editorial Ambar 2003 
Historia de Ada – Editorial RandomHouse Mondadori 2002 
3x1: El món actual a través de 3 generacions – Editorial Plaza & James 2003 
Catalunya, any zero – Editorial Ara llibres 2004 
A favor de Israel -Editorial Certeza (2005) 
La màscara del Rei Artur. Editorial La Magrana (2010)
.-El carrer de l´Embut. Editorial RBA libros (2013).

.-La República Islámica de España. Editorial RBA libros (2011). 

.-Mariona. Editorial RBA libros (2015)

.-Basta (about The threat of jihadism) RBA libros (2016)

.Rosa de cendra. Editorial Planeta. (2017)  |  
. Rosa de ceniza. Editorial Planeta (2017) 9788408169925

External links
Pilar Rahola personal website
Ficha de Pilar Rahola en el Congreso de los Diputados
 Photos of Pilar Rahola 
 Ficha de autor de Pilar Rahola en Diario de América
 Recopilación de presentaciones en los medios argentinos.
 Look left in anger interview in "Haaretz", by Roi Bet Levi
 The anti-Israel hysteria. Article in Haaretz, 09-01-09 (http://www.haaretz.com/hasen/pages/ShArt.jhtml?itemNo=1054155&contrassID=2&subContrassID=4&sbSubContrassID=0)
 Speech of "Mass Media Award" from Pilar Rahola. Title: "A Shout for the voiceless", http://www.ajcarchives.org/AJCAudio/2009AM/PilarRahola050809.mp3
 David Harris's Radio Speech, about Pilar Rahola https://web.archive.org/web/20090513223814/http://www.ajc.org/atf/cf/%7B42d75369-d582-4380-8395-d25925b85eaf%7D/DAVID%20HARRIS%20051209.MP3
 Conference Chamberlain versus Sendler: from darkness to light.  https://web.archive.org/web/20110520154950/http://pilarrahola.com/3_0/CONFERENCIAS/default.cfm?ID=1914

.-http://www.planeta.es/es/pilar-rahola-gana-la-xxxvii-edición-del-premio-ramon-llull-con-rosa-de-cendra

1958 births
Living people
Writers from Catalonia
Barcelona municipal councillors
Members of the 5th Congress of Deputies (Spain)
Members of the 6th Congress of Deputies (Spain)
Spanish Zionists